The Cragie tube or Craigie tube is a method used in microbiology for determining bacterial motility.


Technique
A hollow tube with some culture medium is placed in semi-solid agar inside a bottle. A sample of the bacterium to be tested is inoculated into the medium in the hollow tube and the setup is incubated at 37 °C overnight.

Observation
On examining the areas where bacterial growth has occurred there are several observations to be made:

the colonies of the non-motile bacteria remain confined within the tube at the site of inoculation
the motile bacteria swim out from the bottom of the tube and colonize the surrounding medium as well

Confirmation may be obtained by subculture and retesting.

References

See also
Kauffman-White classification

Bacteriology